Meril Beilmann (born 12 June 1995) is a former Estonian biathlete. She was born in Tallinn. She has competed in the Biathlon World Cup, and represented Estonia at the Biathlon World Championships 2016.

References

1995 births
Living people
Estonian female biathletes
Biathletes at the 2012 Winter Youth Olympics